Filipe Vaz de Azevedo (born 21 January 1975) is a French retired footballer who played as a forward.

External links

1975 births
Living people
Sportspeople from Valence, Drôme
French people of Portuguese descent
Portuguese footballers
French footballers
Association football forwards
Olympique de Marseille players
CS Sedan Ardennes players
Primeira Liga players
Liga Portugal 2 players
F.C. Felgueiras players
F.C. Alverca players
S.C. Campomaiorense players
F.C. Penafiel players
S.C. Salgueiros players
S.C. Olhanense players
Russian Premier League players
FC Lokomotiv Moscow players
Mahindra United FC players
Segunda División B players
CD Ourense footballers
Cypriot First Division players
AEL Limassol players
Expatriate footballers in Russia
Expatriate footballers in India
Expatriate footballers in Spain
Expatriate footballers in Cyprus
Portuguese expatriates in Russia
Portuguese expatriate sportspeople in India
Portuguese expatriate sportspeople in Spain
Portuguese expatriates in Cyprus
Footballers from Auvergne-Rhône-Alpes